Ľubomír Gogolák (born 24 February 1990) is a Slovak football striker who plays for SC Marchegg in Austria.

He has come to Spartak Trnava from the youth squad of Lokomotíva Trnava in summer 2009.

References

External links
Ľubomír Gogolák at ÖFB

1990 births
Living people
Slovak footballers
Slovak expatriate footballers
FC Spartak Trnava players
FK Slovan Duslo Šaľa players
ŠK Senec players
Slovak Super Liga players
Association football forwards
Sportspeople from Trnava
Expatriate footballers in Austria
Slovak expatriate sportspeople in Austria